Helperknapp is a commune in central Luxembourg, in the canton of Mersch. It was established on 1 January 2018 from the amalgamation of the communes of Boevange-sur-Attert and Tuntange.

Populated places
The commune consists of the following villages:

 Boevange-sur-Attert Section:
 Bill
 Boevange-sur-Attert
 Brouch
 Buschdorf
 Grevenknapp
 Fënsterdall
 Obenthalt
 Brichermillen (lieu-dit)
 Fënsterdallerhéicht (lieu-dit)
 Helperknapp (lieu-dit)

 Tuntange Section:
 Ansembourg 
 Bour
 Hollenfels
 Marienthal
 Tuntange (seat)
 Claushof (lieu-dit)
 Kalbacherhof (lieu-dit)
 Marienthalerhof (lieu-dit)

History 
In a two referendums held simultaneously in Boevange-sur-Attert and Tuntange on 25 May 2014, the citizens of  both communes approved a municipal merger, with 69.51% and 64.09%, respectively, in favour. Based on the poll, legislators of the two communes voted in favor of the merger. Consequently, on January 1, 2018, Boevange-sur-Attert and Tüntingen were subsumed into the new municipality of Helperknapp. The name "Helperknapp" derives from the name of a hill of the same name located within the commune.

Population

Twin towns — sister cities

Helperknapp is twinned with:
 Zechin, Germany

References

Communes in Mersch (canton)
Towns in Luxembourg